MV Conister (II)  No. 187114 was a cargo vessel operated by the Isle of Man Steam Packet Company, the second vessel in the Company's history to bear the name.

Construction and dimensions
Conister was a steel; single-screw vessel built by George Brown & Co., at Greenock in 1955.

Length 208'; beam 38'; depth 15'. This gave Conister a service speed of 11 knots.

Service life
The ship entered service with Zillah Shipping & Trading Co Ltd, Liverpool, in 1955 and was named Brentfield.

Brentfield was subsequently sold in 1958 to Coast Lines Ltd, Liverpool, and then in 1965 to Burns & Laird Lines Ltd, Glasgow. Sold back to Coast Lines Ltd in 1968, her services were retained until she was again sold, this time to the Belfast Steamship Company in 1972, and renamed the Spaniel.

In the early 1970s containerization resulted in a marked upsurge in freight business to and from the Isle of Man. In 1973 alone, there was a 31 percent rise in cargo. It was first expected that , operating alongside  would be able to meet this demand and the company sold their other general cargo vessel,  at the beginning of 1973. However, the majority of cargo shipping soon switched to containers, and given Ramseys deficiencies in handling containerized cargoes, it became apparent that a second container vessel would be needed to expedite matters. The Spaniel was chartered as a container ship by the Steam Packet Company early in 1973, and bought outright by them in November of that year.

The consideration was £96,711 (equivalent to £ in ); and upon her purchase she was renamed Conister.

Disposal
By the early 1980s it was apparent to the Steam Packet that in order to compete with their then rival Manxline, the introduction of a RO-RO cargo service was necessary.

Conister was sold to Asturamerican Shipping Co Inc, Panama, and arrived in Spain on 29 September 1981 for scrapping. She was broken up at San Juan De Nieva, Spain by Desguaces Y Salvamentos S.A.

References

Bibliography
 Chappell, Connery (1980). Island Lifeline T.Stephenson & Sons Ltd 

Ships of the Isle of Man Steam Packet Company
1955 ships
Merchant ships of the United Kingdom
Ships built on the River Clyde